Çağlar Çorumlu (born 4 December 1977) is a Turkish actor.

Çorumlu was born in 1977 in Merzifon. His parents were teachers. In 1994, he graduated from Merzifon High School and then moved to Eskişehir. In 2000, he finished his studies at Anadolu University with a degree in tourism and hotel management.. While studying, he joined the theatre club of his university. After finishing his studies, he moved to Istanbul in 2000 to pursue a career in theatre. He soon started a career on stage as well as on television. His first professional experience on stage was at Cabaret Taksim. He then had a role on the sitcom 7 Numara as Yusuf Güdük.. In 2007, he joined the crew of Istanbul City Theatres and worked for them until 2013. In 2013, he founded his own theatre company TiyatrOPS.. Aside from his career in theatre, he has appeared in various movies and TV series. In 2010, he was praised for his role in Çağan Irmak's movie Prensesin Uykusu. Additionally, in 2012, for his performance in an adaptation of Oriental Dentist, he received the Best Actor in a Musical or Comedy award at the 16th Afife Jale Theatre Awards. He played singer Zeki Müren in hit comedy film Arif V 216. He worked as an actor for numerous different roles in the theatrical Güldür Güldür Show, which were released on Show TV. He played in projects of famous humour writers like Gülse Birsel, Cem Yılmaz, and Yılmaz Erdoğan.

Filmography 

Ruhsar : Baha - 2000
Yedi Numara : Yusuf - 2000
Gece Yürüyüşü : Hakan - 2005  
Ters Köşe : Sinan - 2005
Yanılgılar  : Mehmet - 2006 
Ah Polis Olsam : 2006
Hayat Türküsü : Sezgin - 2006
Kader : Kamil - 2006
Ezo Gelin : Zeki - 2006  
Avrupa Yakası : 2007
Derman : Güven - 2008
Üvey Aile : Feyyaz - 2008
Osmanlı Cumhuriyeti : Cooker - 2008   
Haneler : Çağlar - 2009 
Teyzanne : Şaşkın Bakkal - 2009  
 : Umut - 2009
Prensesin Uykusu : Aziz - 2010
Koyu Kırmızı : Galip - 2012
İbret-i Ailem : Kenan - 2012
Güldür Güldür : Şevket - 2013
Cesur Hemşire : Babür - 2013
Aldırma Gönül : Levent - 2013
Daire : Necip - 2014
Pek Yakında : Zeki - 2014
Yok Artık! : Semih - 2015
Bulantı: Beşir - 2015
Kor : Aslan - 2016
Tatlım Tatlım:Haybeden Gerçeküstü Aşk : 2017
Kolonya Cumhuriyeti : Peker - 2017
Arif V 216 : Zeki Müren - 2018
Cebimdeki Yabancı : 2018
Jet Sosyete : Yaşar Yüksel - (2018–2019 / 2020)
Karakomik Filmler 2: Emanet - 2020
Babam Çok Değişti : Mehmet Ali - 2020–2021
Ayak İşleri : Vedat - 2021–2022
The Life and Movies of Erşan Kuneri : Altın Oran - 2022
Hazine : Mesut - 2022

Awards 
2012 - 16th Afife Theatre Awards, "Best Actor in a Musical or Comedy Role" (Oriental Dentist )
2015 - 20th Sadri Alışık Cinema Awards, "Best Supporting Actor in a Musical or Comedy Role" (Pek Yakında)
2017 - 44th Golden Butterfly Awards, "Best Comedy & Romantic Actor" (Güldür Güldür Show)

References

External links 

1977 births
People from Merzifon
Turkish male stage actors
Turkish male film actors
Turkish male television actors
Living people
Golden Butterfly Award winners